Ashton Nyte is a South African-born singer, songwriter, producer, composer, author, actor, and frontman of the gothic rock band The Awakening. Nyte has released seven solo albums, in addition to ten albums as The Awakening and several other projects and collaborations. He is considered to be a pioneer of alternative music in South Africa, and has been described as "something of a musical genius" for his typical method of composing, playing and recording each instrument himself on most of his releases. Nyte is widely known in South Africa for his chart-topping cover of Simon and Garfunkel's "The Sound of Silence" and several other top singles. His signature style combines baritone vocals, garnering comparisons to David Bowie and Johnny Cash, with instrumentation that ranges from lyric-driven acoustic folk, to alternative rock, to post-punk and electronic music, as well as a penchant for the theatrical. Nyte has been based in the US since 2009.

Biography

Early years
Born in Port Elizabeth in Apartheid-era South Africa, Nyte relocated frequently throughout his childhood until settling in Johannesburg as a teenager.  Born into an Afrikaans and English-speaking family, he grew up in a bilingual environment and composed works in both languages.  Due to South Africa's then-mandatory military service, upon completion of tertiary education, Nyte was faced with choosing either military service or university studies. Although his only career interest was music from an early age, Nyte completed his degree as an architect while singing in his first band, Martyr's Image. In 1995, Nyte formed The Awakening.

1990s
Nyte rose to prominence in South Africa during the end of the 1990s as front man, writer and producer for The Awakening. His first album, Risen featured the band's first hit single, a cover of Simon and Garfunkel's "The Sounds of Silence" which brought national media attention along with club and radio rotation. The cover went to number one on South African national radio. Following the success of Risen, Nyte began to write The Awakening's second album entitled Request which embraced the electronic and industrial sounds of 1980s new romantic movement.  These influences were openly acknowledged by Nyte, who describes his musical tastes as "very broad" and names among his personal heroes the likes of David Bowie and Kate Bush and Elvis Presley. The single Maree from Request went to No. 1 on the SA rock charts.

The Awakening's first music video was filmed for the single "Rain" by director Katinka Harrod. The video was filmed in the middle of winter which posed a unique challenge for Nyte who performed under icy water during filming, was painted black in body paint, and hosed clean for other scenes. The video brought more public exposure for the band and was aired on several music shows throughout Africa. In August 1998, The Awakening headlined the second stage at South Africa's largest music festival, Oppikoppi.

In November 1998 Nyte launched his own record label and began to produce and promote other South African artists in addition to handling all management and distribution of The Awakening.  A third album, Ethereal Menace, was released in 1999.  The album utilized elements of industrial music, later dubbed as "dark future rock" by Nyte.  The album achieved an enthusiastic reception: Another music video was produced for the single "The March"  by South African Music Awards winning director Eban Olivier. The video for "The March" was placed in rotation on MTV Europe. That year The Awakening headlined the Oppikoppi music festival to over 30,000 people.

2000s
After the release of the third Awakening album, Nyte released his first solo album, The Slender Nudes, in early 2000. Heralded as a "glamorous departure" from The Awakening's harder rock stylings, The Slender Nudes''' style was described as "Ziggy-era glam rock with '80s-induced synthpop." The album ranked 14th of the top 30 albums for 2000 in South Africa, and featured Nyte's experimentation with alter-egos such as the "Electric Man" and "Glam Vamp." Two videos were produced for the album, "Glam Vamp Baby" (included on the album's disc) and "Need for Air" both of which were aired throughout South African television. The single "Glam Vamp Baby" was featured as a track on Universal Records/Sheer Music's Indie Essentials compilation.

The South African version of The Slender Nudes featured a cover photo of Nyte kneeling next to a pale nude woman; when the album was released in the US, distributors feared that the artwork would prove objectionable to the American market.  An alternative cover was proposed and copies sold in the US feature an image of Nyte as the Glam Vamp, the artist's androgynous, sometimes cross-dressed alter-ego portrayed in the same-titled video, as a result. Ashton Nyte once again performed as a headliner at the Oppikoppi Music Festival.

Complementary to the glamorous and decadent imagery of The Slender Nudes, Nyte released The Awakening's fourth album, The Fourth Seal of Zeen in September 2000. The album displays a range of sounds between darkwave and classic gothic rock. The song "The Dark Romantics" became a club dance floor anthem throughout the world and remains one of the band's most beloved singles. In May 2001, Nyte created his first theatre piece, The Slender Nudes Cabaret, which was performed at Die Teaterhuisie Theatre in Pretoria, South Africa. He also performed a headline slot at the first Pink Loerie Mardi Gras and Arts Festival in Knysna, South Africa. In December 2001, The Awakening released a follow-up to Zeen – an EP called The Fountain which featured songs closely linked in style and atmosphere. The eponymous single "The Fountain" went to number four on the South African rock charts, and charted in the top 10 for nine weeks, with another single "Martyr" topping the charts.

True to Cosmopolitan Magazine's description of Nyte as "Johannesburg's Bowie" Nyte chose to abandon the hedonistic persona of the Glam Vamp for his next solo album, Dirt Sense released in 2002.  The album spent 17 weeks in South Africa's charts topping out at number two.
Described as "stripped down, minimalist, under-produced, almost dirty", and "a powerful album with strong tunes and hard-hitting lyrics" the album contains some of the artist's "most personal" songs.  A video was produced for the single "Window" and aired throughout South African music television. In May 2002, Nyte was the male lead in the play "My Bloody Valentine" which premiered at the National Arts Festival in Grahamstown, South Africa.

In June 2002 The Awakening recorded its "most aggressive, guitar-driven album to date," entitled Roadside Heretics. Thematically, Roadside Heretics deals with a discriminated-against and isolated people, a subject well known to South Africa. According to Nyte, Roadside Heretics marked a new era for The Awakening, as the band focused on capturing their trademark live performance intensity within the album's sound.  In the same year, a compilation album entitled Sacrificial Etchings was released, featuring singles from 1997 to 2002 and a few previously unreleased songs including the hit single "Vampyre Girl." The album Sacrificial Etchings ranked as the 18th top album of 2003 in South Africa.

In early 2003, Nyte released his third solo album, Sinister Swing.  Described as "organic electronic / experimental" music, the album received critical acclaim for the hybrid of pre-1980s electro and the "icy echoes of isolation...and just a hint of swing." Nyte later wrote and starred in an adaptation of Sinister Swing with the University of Pretoria's theatre department as a cabaret piece. Later that year Nyte founded The Red Room, which went on to become one of South Africa's most established and longest-running alternative music dance clubs.

A year later Nyte began to work on The Awakening's Darker Than Silence, with lyrical themes about devastation and medication.  Songs such as "One More Crucifixion", "Angelyn", and "The Needle and The Gun" achieved a positive reception worldwide and notable success on South African and German charts, where it was released on an independent Germna music label. The success brought the band to tour the United States for the first time in 2004.

In July 2005, Nyte released his fourth solo album entitled Headspace with his solo band Ashton Nyte and The Accused representing the live line-up of five musicians. Music videos for the singles "My Little Rock 'n Roll" and "Murder Me" were aired throughout South Africa. Ashton Nyte and The Accused performed at The Woodstock Festival (South Africa) before embarking on a national tour in December 2005.

In 2006 The Awakening signed a management deal with German-based MCM Music, and later signed a record deal with German label Massacre Records.  The Awakening then released its eighth studio album entitled Razor Burn.  With the European distribution and marketing of Massacre Records, the album received more notice than the band's previous albums as well as positive reviews from the alternative music press, and a second US tour followed in 2007 along with a headline appearance at RAMfest, South Africa's largest alternative music festival. The following year the band returned for a third tour of the US, this time with one of its first 2008 US shows as a headliner of HM Magazine's stage at Cornerstone Festival 2008.

2010–2019
In late 2009, Nyte departed completely from his rock persona and completed his fifth solo album, The Valley, described on PRI's The World as "giving South African music a new spin." Other reviews describe the album as "a collection of songs caressed with Americana styling as uniquely as only a non-American could" and "an ingeniously crafted pictorial."  The Valley was released in the United States in June 2010 accompanied by a multi-date tour and over 40 Triple-A format radio stations giving it airplay. Two of the album's songs became semi-finalists in the International Songwriting Competition the same year. Nyte was invited to the internationally acclaimed radio show Border Crossings, where he performed select songs from The Valley live on air to more than 125 million listeners.

Following the US success of The Valley, in 2012 Nyte announced that he was planning to release his next album written entirely in Afrikaans, entitled Moederland which he referred to as "an album that pays homage to my Afrikaans heritage and the country that has shaped me." The album's lead single entitled Kan Ons Weer Begin went to No. 1 on major Afrikaans stations throughout South Africa and remained in the top ten for several weeks. The album features a duet with Afrikaans music icon Karin Hougaard entitled "Lukas" which also went to No. 1. Ashton later joined Karin on stage to sing "Lukas" at her Atterbury Theatre performance on 2 March 2014. In December 2014 Moederland was named one of the top ten best Afrikaans albums of the year by Netwerk24, South Africa's largest Afrikaans media outlet.

2014 also saw the release of Anthology XV, a new greatest hits compilation for The Awakening featuring two new singles "Fault" and "Beneath Your Feet" in addition to remastered versions of selected hits from the band's lengthy career. A music video was released for "Fault" in late 2013 to promote the new tracks and updated sound.

In early 2015 South Africa's leading independent music company Just Music announced the release of Ashton Nyte's album entitled Some Kind of Satellite. The album marked Nyte's return to writing songs in the English language. The video for the first single "Dressing Like You" was championed by the New York-based alternative arts and culture publication Auxiliary Magazine who described it in their press release as "a haunting, melodic, some-what fragile ode to love, loss, and the quest for silence in a digital world. The music video was shot in Las Vegas and the Nevada desert by Intervention Arts, in glorious gritty tones and film noir sensibilities, and serves as an apt introduction to the new artistic chapter in Nyte’s story...the album marks a return to Nyte’s dark theatrical roots, described by Nyte as, “poetry for the brokenhearted... who still like to dance from time to time.” It is an album that is as glamorous, isolationist, and diverse as its creator." The video was quickly picked up by international press. A second video for the album's premier radio track "See Me Cry" was released in March 2015 followed by a video for "A Halo in the Dirt".

In 2016, Nyte and The Awakening joined The Mission UK on their 17 date tour of the album Another Fall from Grace, which spanned 17 European countries. Following this tour, Nyte contributed vocals, lyrics, and music to albums by MGT (featuring members of The Mission UK, and Peter Murphy) and to Michael Ciravolo's Beauty In Chaos project, which includes members of The Cure, Cheap Trick, Ice-T, Ministry, The Mission UK and many more. The Nyte / Ciravolo composition “Bloodless And Fragile” was featured in the television program The Purge on the USA network in 2018. After a US tour with MGT, Nyte released The Awakening's ninth album, Chasm. The album spawned music videos for the singles "About You" and "Back To Wonderland" which were both created by Nyte.

2019 saw Ashton working on the score of the movie Don't Let Go with composer Ethan Gold, which premiered at the Sundance Film Festival in January 2019. Nyte also contributed to the second and third Beauty Chaos releases and completed a 36-date European Tour with British indie artist Wayne Hussey in September / October 2019. The tour featured Nyte performing entirely solo, accompanied only by his acoustic guitar.

2020–present
Nyte released Waiting For A Voice, his 7th solo album, and his first book of poetry, short stories, and personal reflections in July 2020. Once again, Nyte directed, filmed, and edited a music video for the title track of the new, largely acoustic body of work. Writing for American Songwriter, Tina Benitez-Eves described the work as "Flawlessly poetic in its lyricism, Nyte opens a chapter of his life that is intimate, reflective, and enlightening, traversing childhood inspirations, a spiritual and mystical connection to nature, and how everything somehow comes full circle."

Unable to tour due to the ongoing Covid-19 Pandemic, Nyte resumed work in the studio and released The Awakening's 10th album, This Alchemy in May 2021. The album was a marked departure for The Awakening, with a stronger electronic presence, especially evident in the lead singles, "Zero Down" and "A Victory Of Love," which both featured music videos created by Nyte. 

In early 2022, Nyte announced via social media that he had been working on several new projects, scheduled for releases later in the year.

Personal life
In 2009 Nyte married American artist Rose Mortem. Rose is credited with piano and keyboards on The Awakening's 2009 release, Tales of Absolution and Obsoletion, and played in the band's 2009 US tour lineup to promote the release. The couple has two sons.

Philanthropy
In 2001, Ashton Nyte organized the first of three national Rock Against Rape music festivals. The concert series was hosted in 2001, 2002, and 2004, aiding rape awareness and funding the organizations such as POWA and SHEP, responsible for counseling rape and abuse victims in South Africa. The series featured artists supporting the cause and included The Awakening, The Parlotones, Not My Dog, Fuzigish, Jo Day, Tweak, Cutting Jade, and many more. In addition to supporting women's rights, Nyte has also been a vocal proponent of LGBT equality throughout his career. The song "Girlie" was inspired by the artist's own encounters with homophobia when dressing androgynously and served as a song of solidarity with the gay and transgender community. In more recent times, Nyte has toured several US universities to deliver a lecture series on tolerance and his experiences as a young
artist growing up during Apartheid-era South Africa.

Discography
Studio albums as Ashton Nyte
 The Slender Nudes (2000)
 Dirt Sense (2002)
 Sinister Swing (2003)
 Headspace (2005)
 The Valley (2009 South Africa, 2010 US)
 Moederland (2014)
 Some Kind of Satellite (2015)
 Waiting For a Voice (2020)

Studio albums as The Awakening
 Risen  (1997)
 Request  (1998)
 Ethereal Menace  (1999)
 The Fourth Seal of Zeen  (2000)
 The Fountain  (2001)
 Roadside Heretics  (2002)
 Sacrificial Etchings (best of) (2003)
 Darker Than Silence  (2004)
 Razor Burn  (2006)
 Tales of Absolution and Obsoletion  (2009)
 Anthology XV  (2014)
 Chasm (2019)
 This Alchemy (2021)

Compilation appearances
 Essential Indie: Volume 1 Universal Records, Sheer Music
 5FM SA Music Explosion 1 EMI
 Dark Awakening COP International
 Unquiet Grave 2 Cleopatra Records
 Orgazmatracks 2 David Gresham Records
 Moonlight Cathedral Cold Fusion
 Orgazmatracks 3 Alter Ego
 The Doors Nightclub David Gresham Records

EPs
 The March  (1999)
 Sentimental Runaways (1999)
 The Fountain'' (2001)

Music videos
 Rain (1998)
 The March (1999)
 Glam Vamp Baby (2000)
 Need for Air (2000)
 Window (2002)
 Murder Me (2005)
 My Little Rock 'n Roll (2005)
 Jennifer (2010)
 Alles Vir Jou (2013)
 Lukas (2014)
 Fault (2014)
 Dressing Like You (2015)
 See Me Cry (2015)
 Halo In the Dirt (2015)
 The Crying Game (2017)
 Waiting for a Voice (2020)
 Zero Down (2021)
 A Victory of Love (2021)

References

External links
Ashton Nyte official website

The Awakening official website

South African rock musicians
Living people
21st-century South African male singers
South African singer-songwriters
South African guitarists
Male guitarists
Alternative rock musicians
Gothic rock musicians
South African expatriates in the United States
White South African people
Year of birth missing (living people)
20th-century South African male singers